François-Frédéric-Raoul Toché (7 October 1850 – 18 January 1895 was a French playwright and journalist.

Life and career
Toché was born on 7 October 1850 in Rueil, now known as Rueil-Malmaison, near Paris. As a playwright he is known for his collaborations with Ernest Blum. He also collaborated with Émile de Najac and Paul Siraudin. He contributed to libretti for Jacques Offenbach, Gaston Serpette and Théodore Dubois.

As a journalist he edited Le Gaulois under the pseudonym "Frimousse". His other pen names included Escopette, Raoul Tavel, Robert Triel and Gavroche. Between 1881 and 1885 he published annual retrospectives of theatrical productions in Paris

Toché was made a chevalier of the Legion of Honour in 1893. In desperate financial straits, caused by gambling debts, he killed himself on 18 January 1895 at Chantilly by shooting himself in the head.

Stage works
Works to which Toche contributed include:
1877 – Chanteuse par amour
1878 – La revue des Variétés
1880 – Belle Lurette
1881 – La Noce d'Ambroise
1884 – Le Château de Tire-Larigot
1885 – Le Gazier
1885 – Le Petit chaperon rouge
1888 – Les Femmes nerveuses
1889 – Le Parfum
1890 – Les Miettes de l'année
1890 – Le Collectionneur
1890 – Le Cadenas
1890 – Paris fin de siècle
1892 – Le Monde ou l'on flirte
1893 – La maison Tamponin
1893 – Les Femmes des amis
1894 – Madame Mongodin.
Source: Bibliothèque nationale de France, and The New York Times.

References

1850 births
1895 deaths
19th-century French dramatists and playwrights
19th-century French journalists
French male journalists